Serra is a municipality in the state of Espírito Santo, Brazil. Bordering the north of the state's capital, Vitória, the municipality is part of the Greater Vitória metropolitan area. Its population was 527,240 (2020) and its area is 548 km.

Serra, the seat of the municipality, is to the north of the characteristic Mestre Álvaro mountain which juts out of the coastal lowlands, and which is said to look like a small mountain range or "serra", in Portuguese, which is where the town and municipality got its name.

Politics
Serra has five districts (distritos): Serra-Capital (or Serra-Sede), Carapina, Calogi, Nova Almeida and Queimado. Among those districts there are 118 neighbourhoods (bairros).

Another important urban area is that of Jacaraípe, on the coast 20 km north of Vitória. Jacaraípe is very well known for surfing championships, and is a weekend beach used by capital dwellers. Other smaller fishing villages such as Manguinhos are also close enough for day trips and are popular destinations for the locals.

The coastline of the municipality is protected in part by the  Costa das Algas Environmental Protection Area, created in 2010.

Neighbourhoods of Serra 
André Carloni
Alterosa
Bairro de Fátima
Balneário de Carapebus
Barcelona
Barro Branco
Bicanga
Boa Vista
Carapina
Cascata
Central Carapina
Chácara Parreiral
Cidade Continental
Cidade Pomar
Colina de Laranjeiras
Divinópolis
El Dourado
Eurico Salles
Feu Rosa
Hélio Ferraz
Jacaraípe
Jardim Carapina
Jardim Limoeiro
Jardim Tropical
José de Anchieta
Laranjeiras
Laranjeiras II
Laranjeiras Velha
Mata da Serra
Manoel Plaza
Morada de Laranjeiras
Nova Almeida
Nova Carapina I
Nova Carapina II
Novo Horizonte
Novo Porto Canoa
Parque Residência de Laranjeiras
Parque Residência de Tubarão
Porto Canoa
Rosário de Fátima
Santo Antonio
São Diogo I
São Diogo II
São Geraldo
São Marcos I
São Marcos II
São Marcos III
Serra Dourada I
Serra Dourada II
Serra Dourada III
Taquara
Taquara I
Taquara I
Taquara III
Valparaíso
Vila Nova De Colares

References

External links
History of Serra (in Portuguese)
Images Maps Google of Serra ES Brazil

Populated coastal places in Espírito Santo
Municipalities in Espírito Santo